Hillsong United (stylised as Hillsong UNITED or UNITED) is a worship collective that originated as a part of Hillsong Church. Formed in 1998 as part of Hillsong's youth ministry, the band consists of several rotating worship leaders from the church, including Joel Houston, Taya Smith-Gaukrodger, Matt Crocker, Jonathon Douglass, Brooke Fraser, Jad Gillies and Benjamin Hastings. Due to several songs written by the youth ministry, Hillsong Worship leader Darlene Zschech recommended that they record an album, which resulted in their debut extended play, One, which was released alongside the Hillsong Worship album Touching Heaven Changing Earth. Since then, the group has released fourteen live albums, as well as five studio albums (Sixteen albums in total). The band composes songs and performs in church services as well as concerts in worldwide tours.

History 
The band was originally formed in 1998, by close friends from within the youth ministry called "Powerhouse Youth", led by Hillsong Youth Pastors Phil and Lucinda Dooley for many years. As the house band for the Powerhouse meetings, the group played original songs and rearranged popular radio tunes at their weekly meeting for local youth aged 16–25. Band members sometimes also contributed to the larger interdenominational ministry Youth Alive Australia and its albums. Most members of the band also attended Hillsong Church services.

Powerhouse grew and split in the mid 1990s into two youth groups: Powerhouse (aged 18–25) and Wildlife (12–17). Reuben Morgan, assisted by guitarist Marcus Beaumont and vocalist/songwriter Tanya Riches, administrated the band and music for Powerhouse and all United nights, albums and events until 2003, when the role was passed on to Joel Houston. The three performed with the 18–25's Powerhouse band that also included Mark Stevens, Nigel Hendroff, Peter King and Raymond Badham. For the older group, Peter King was the main piano player and music director, with guitarist Nigel Hendroff later taking the music directing role. In the younger ministry Wildlife, it was former Channel V Leg-Up competition-winning Able band boys Joel Houston and Marty Sampson, with Able band's Luke Munns and Michael Guy Chislett being the main drummer and guitarist respectively, while Joel Houston played bass. They were initially trained by Russell Fragar. Marty Sampson, Holly Dawson, Mark Stevens, Katrina Peoples, Michelle Fragar, Tanya Riches and Bec Mesiti were some of the original key vocalists. In late 1997, the team made a huge impact at their youth ministry's summer camp. On returning from the camp, the youth ministries of Hillsong Church decided to join together monthly, calling these meetings the "UNITED" Nights.

Darlene Zschech suggested to Reuben Morgan that the youth band make an album in 1998 after so many songs were written in the youth ministry.
As a result, the EP One was recorded by a new band. Everyday was recorded in 1999 and packaged with the Hillsong Worship annual album. Both achieved Gold sales status in Australia. The band continued to release an album each year, rebranding as Hillsong United. In 2002, after Reuben Morgan stepped down as co-worship leader of the band, Joel Houston, the eldest son of the church's senior pastor Brian Houston, and Marty Sampson led the group together.

Band members are involved in Hillsong Church services and also play for the church. Many are volunteers who go unpaid for their time or contribution. As such, the line up changes on a regular basis due to the volunteers' needs and the needs of the church; that is to say, due to the naturally resultant "churn". Luke Munns, the drummer for the band from 1998 through 2006, played on seven live recordings before transitioning from the drums to front the rock and indie band LUKAS. Sampson stepped down as one of the main leaders of the band following his marriage in November 2006. He contributed two more songs with United—"Devotion", which he wrote and sang, and "Saviour King", which he wrote with Mia Fieldes—before officially stepping down. These songs were part of the 2007 release All of the Above. Current members of the Hillsong United band include Joel Houston, Jonathon Douglass (J.D.), Jadwin "Jad" Gillies, Matt Crocker, Taya Smith, Dylan Thomas (on rhythm guitar), Timon Klein (on lead guitar), Peter James & Benjamin Tennikoff (on keyboards), Adam Crosariol (on bass guitar), and Simon Kobler (on drums).

The annual Hillsong United CD and DVD was recorded for many years during the Hillsong youth ministry's October conference Encounterfest, and then released in the first quarter of the following year. The 2007 album All of the Above was the first album to be fully studio recorded. The band has toured in a number of countries, leading worship in various places and has an international influence. The official UNITED logo was designed by Munns in 2002 for To the Ends of the Earth.

In 2014, Hillsong United was nominated for and won five GMA Dove Awards, including Song of the Year for "Oceans (Where Feet May Fail)". The band also received its first ever American Music Awards nomination that year, for Favorite Artist – Contemporary Inspirational, but did not win. 2015 saw the band nominated for a second consecutive year in the same category at the 43rd edition of the show. It was also nominated for the first time at that year's Billboard Music Awards in the Top Christian Artist and Top Christian Song categories; it won the former. The band was nominated again at the 2016 Billboard Music Awards, and garnered four nods across all three Christian categories, winning its second consecutive Top Christian Artist award, and its first for Top Christian Song with "Oceans (Where Feet May Fail)". The band won two Dove Awards, including Worship Album of the Year, for its fourth studio album Empires, at the 47th Gospel Music Awards held that October. In 2018, the band received four nominations at the 49th GMA Dove Awards including one for Artist of the Year—it won Recorded Worship Song of the Year for its single "So Will I (100 BillionX)".

Members 

Current

The members of the band  were:
 Joel Houston – worship leader, acoustic guitar, keyboard, percussion
 Jonathon "JD" Douglass – worship leader, percussion
 Jad Gillies – worship leader, acoustic guitar and electric guitar
 Matt Crocker – worship leader, acoustic guitar, percussion
 Taya Smith-Gaukrodger – worship leader
 Michael Guy Chislett – electric guitar, keyboards, music director, producer
 Dylan Thomas – electric guitar, keyboards, music director
 Benjamin "Ben" Tennikoff – keyboard, programming, sampling
 Jihea Oh – bass guitar
 Benjamin Hastings – worship leader, acoustic guitar, keyboard
 Dan McMurray – drums, percussion 

 Former

Former members of the band are:
 Reuben Morgan – worship leader, acoustic guitar 
 Marty Sampson – worship leader, acoustic guitar
 Brooke Fraser – worship leader, acoustic guitar  
 Raymond Badham – electric guitar  
 Marcus Beaumont – electric guitar 
 Nigel Hendroff – electric guitar
 Nathan Taylor – electric guitar
 Timon Klein – electric guitar
 Matt Tennikoff – bass guitar
 Adam Crosariol – bass guitar
 Brandon Gillies – drums, percussion
 Gabriel Kelly – drums, percussion
 Rolf Wam Fjell – drums, percussion
 Luke Munns – drums, percussion
 Simon Kobler – drums, percussion
 David George –  piano, keyboard, synthesizer
 Peter James – piano, keyboard, synthesizer
 Kevin Lee – piano, keyboard, synthesizer
 Peter King – piano, keyboard, synthesizer
 Dave Ware – worship leader
 Tulele Faletolu – worship leader
 Annie Garratt – worship leader
 Sam Knock – worship leader
 Holly Dawson – worship leader
 Jill McCloghry – guitar, vocals
 Michelle Fragar – worship leader

Timeline

Discography

Studio albums

Live albums

Soundtrack albums

Others

Singles

Other charted songs

Videography 

 2004: More Than Life (bonus DVD with album)
 2005: Look to You (bonus DVD with album)
 2006: United We Stand (bonus DVD with album)
 2007: All of the Above (bonus DVD with album)
 2008: The I Heart Revolution: With Hearts As One (Music DVD)
 2010: The I Heart Revolution: We're All in This Together (Documentary DVD/Blu-ray)
 2012: Live in Miami (Music DVD/Blu-ray)
 2013: Zion Acoustic Sessions (Music DVD)
 2016: Of Dirt and Grace: Live from the Land (Music DVD/Blu-ray)

A documentary, Hillsong: Let Hope Rise, directed by Michael John Warren, chronicles the rise of the band, was originally supposed be released by Warner Bros. during the 2015 Easter weekend. As Alcon Entertainment and Warner Bros. were unable to close a deal, the film was pulled out from Warner Bros's schedule. In March 2015, Relativity Media obtained the distribution rights and the film shifted to a 29 May release. In April, Relativity moved the film to 30 September 2015. However, Relativity Media filed for Chapter 11 bankruptcy in July and let go of the rights to the producers. PureFlix acquired the film and it was released 16 September 2016.

Awards
As of 2020 the group has received 11 Dove Awards.

See also 
 Hillsong Young & Free
 Youth Alive Australia
 The I Heart Revolution: With Hearts as One

References 

"Hillsong United Webpage". Published by Hillsong Church. Retrieved 8 January 2008.
"Hillsong United on Integrity Music". Published by Integrity Media. Retrieved 8 January 2008.
"Review on Christianity Today". Published by Christian Music Today. Retrieved 8 January 2008.
"Shout to the Lord!: Music and Change at Hillsong 1996–2007". Dissertation for the award of Masters of Philosophy, Australian Catholic University, 2010. Riches, Tanya. Retrieved 3 March 2012
 "Secularising the Sacred: The Impact of Geoff Bullock on Contemporary Congregational Song in Sydney, 1990-1999". Dissertation for the award of PhD, Macquarie University, 2002. Evans, Mark. Retrieved 3 March 2012
"Open up the Doors: Music in the Modern Church" London: Equinox, 2006. Evans, Mark.

External links 
 
 Hillsong United Albums
 Interview @ Christian Music Today, 6/07

Hillsong Church
Musical groups established in 1998
Australian Christian rock groups
Gospel music groups
Performers of contemporary worship music